The ratchet-tailed treepie (Temnurus temnurus) is a species of bird in the crow and jay family Corvidae. The species is also known as the notch-tailed treepie. It is monotypic within the genus Temnurus.

The species has a disjunct distribution in Southeast Asia and China. One population is found in southern Thailand, another in southern Vietnam, another in central and northern Vietnam and Laos, and the last in Hainan in China. Its natural habitat is tropical moist broadleaf evergreen lowland forests, and secondary forest and scrubland.

References 

ratchet-tailed treepie
Birds of Hainan
Birds of Laos
Birds of Vietnam
ratchet-tailed treepie
Taxonomy articles created by Polbot